Clostridium fimetarium is a Gram-positive, psychoactive, anaerobic and saccharolytic bacterium from the genus Clostridium which has been isolated from cattle manure in Russia.

References

 

Bacteria described in 1997
fervidum